Paenibacillus alvei (formerly Bacillus alvei) is a species of bacteria within the order Bacillales. Like other species within the genus Paenibacillus, strains of this species grow in novel, vortex-like, or branched patterns. This species is associated with the honey bee disease European foulbrood.

References

External links
Type strain of Paenibacillus alvei at BacDive -  the Bacterial Diversity Metadatabase

Paenibacillaceae
Bacteria described in 1885